Dodge City Regional Airport  is three miles east of Dodge City, in Ford County, Kansas. It is used for general aviation and is subsidized by the Essential Air Service program.

The National Plan of Integrated Airport Systems for 2011–2015 categorized it as a non-primary commercial service facility. The Federal Aviation Administration says this airport had 4,701 passenger boardings (enplanements) in calendar year 2008, 3,373 in 2009 and 3,853 in 2010.

Facilities
The airport covers 451 acres (183 ha) at an elevation of 2,594 feet (791 m). It has two asphalt runways: 14/32 is 6,899 by 100 feet (2,103 x 30 m) and 2/20 is 4,649 by 100 feet (1,417 x 30 m).

In the year ending January 31, 2008 the airport had 23,501 aircraft operations, average 64 per day: 77% general aviation, 16% airline, 6% air taxi, and 1% military. 33 aircraft were then based at this airport: 82% single-engine and 18% multi-engine.

Airline and destination

Statistics

See also 

 Dodge City Army Airfield, which later became Dodge City Municipal Airport (now closed)

References

Other sources 

 Essential Air Service documents (Docket DOT-OST-1998-3502) from the U.S. Department of Transportation:
 Order 2009-9-5 (September 11, 2009): re-selecting Great Lakes Aviation, Ltd., to provide essential air service (EAS) at Dodge City, Garden City, Great Bend, Hays, and Liberal for the two-year period from October 1, 2009, through September 30, 2011, at combined annual subsidy rates of $8,897,565. Dodge City, Kansas: Docket OST-1998-3497; Effective Period: Start of Denver-Only service through September 30, 2011; Scheduled Service: 12 nonstop and 12 one-stop round trips per week to Denver; Aircraft: Beech 1900, 19-seats.
 Order 2011-10-24 (October 31, 2011): re-selecting Great Lakes Aviation, Ltd., to provide essential air service (EAS) at Dodge City for $1,688,598 annual subsidy. Effective Period: Two-year period beginning when American Eagle begins full EAS (at Garden City) through the 24th month thereafter. Dodge City: 17 nonstop round trips per week to Denver. Aircraft: Beech 1900.
 Order 2014-3-9 (March 14, 2014): re-selects Great Lakes Airlines at Dodge City and Liberal, Kansas. Dodge City, Kansas: Docket 1998–3502; Effective Period: May 1, 2014, through July 31, 2016; Service: Eighteen (18) nonstop round trips per week to Denver (DEN); Aircraft Type: Beech 1900; Annual Subsidy: $2,339,131.

External links 
 Dodge City Regional Airport at Dodge City website
 Crotts Aircraft Service, the fixed-base operator (FBO)
 Aerial image as of September 1991 from USGS The National Map
  from Kansas DOT Airport Directory
 
 

Airports in Kansas
Essential Air Service
Buildings and structures in Ford County, Kansas
Regional Airport